Gunna Kalan railway station is located in Gunna Kalan village, Sialkot district of Punjab province, Pakistan.

See also
 List of railway stations in Pakistan
 Pakistan Railways

References

External links

Railway stations in Sialkot District
Railway stations on Wazirabad–Narowal Branch Line